John Frederick Dashiell (April 30, 1888 – May 3, 1975) was an American psychologist and a past president of the American Psychological Association.

Biography
Dashiell was born in 1888 in Southport, Indiana. Early in his career, Dashiell taught at Waynesburg College, Princeton University, University of Minnesota and Oberlin College.

Dashiell became a department head at the University of North Carolina. He was APA president in 1938. In his presidential address that year, he called for psychology to reconnect with philosophy for its methodology and logic. He was president of the Society for the Teaching of Psychology in 1953–1954.

References

External links

1888 births
1975 deaths
Presidents of the American Psychological Association
Waynesburg University faculty
Princeton University faculty
University of Minnesota faculty
University of North Carolina alumni
20th-century American psychologists